New Street may refer to:

 Birmingham New Street railway station, a railway station in Birmingham, UK
 New Street, Birmingham, a street in Birmingham, United Kingdom
 New Street, Brussels (Rue Neuve/Nieuwstraat), a street in Brussels, Belgium
 New Street (York), a street in York, United Kingdom
 New Street, Kent, England, a hamlet in Ash-cum-Ridley parish